Gymnopilus minutosporus is a species of mushroom in the family Hymenogastraceae.

See also

List of Gymnopilus species

External links
Gymnopilus minutosporus at Index Fungorum

minutosporus
Fungi of North America